Frank Greinert (February 5, 1909 – November 9, 1965) was a U.S. soccer player who was a member of the U.S. soccer team at the 1936 Summer Olympics.  At the time, he played for the Philadelphia German-Americans of the American Soccer League.

References

External links

1909 births
1965 deaths
American soccer players
Olympic soccer players of the United States
Footballers at the 1936 Summer Olympics
American Soccer League (1933–1983) players
Uhrik Truckers players
Association football defenders